Saint-Adalbert is a municipality in Quebec, Canada, on the Canada–United States border.

See also
L'Islet Regional County Municipality
Big Black River (Saint John River), a river
List of municipalities in Quebec

References

External links
 

Municipalities in Quebec
Incorporated places in Chaudière-Appalaches